Das Mädchen auf dem Brett is an East German film (translates as "The Girl on the Board"). It was released in 1967.

External links

1967 films
East German films
1960s German-language films
German sports films
1960s German films